The governors of the states of India have similar powers and functions at the state level as those of the president of India at the central level. Governors exist in the states, while lieutenant governors exist in union territories including the National Capital Territory (NCT) of Delhi. The governor acts as the nominal head whereas the real power lies with the chief ministers of the states and his or her councils of ministers. Although, in union territories, the real power lies with the lieutenant governor or administrator, except in the NCT of Delhi and Puducherry, where the governor shares power with a council of ministers headed by a chief minister. Few or no governors are local to the state that they are appointed.

In India, a lieutenant governor is leader of a union territory. However, the rank is present only in the union territories of Andaman and Nicobar Islands, Ladakh, Jammu and Kashmir, Delhi and Puducherry (the other territories have a administrator appointed, who is usually a politician of the ruling party in the Government of India). However, the governor of Punjab serves as the administrator  of Chandigarh. Lieutenant governors do not hold the same rank as a governor of a state in the list of precedence.

The governors and lieutenant governors are appointed by the president for a term of five years.

Selection process

Qualifications 
Article 157 and Article 158 of the Constitution of India specify eligibility requirements for the post of governor. They are as follows:

A governor:

 must be at least 35 years of age.
 should not be a member of the either house of the parliament or house of the state legislature.
 should not hold any office of profit.
Traditionally, governors are not appointed to lead the states where they reside, although this is not stipulated in the constitution.

Appointment 
The governor of a state is appointed by the president of India. The factors based on which the president evaluates the candidates is not mentioned in the Constitution.

Powers and functions 

The primary function of the governor is to preserve, protect and defend the constitution and the law as incorporated in their oath of office under Article 159 of the Indian constitution in the administration of the state affairs. All the governor's actions, recommendations and supervisory powers (Article 167c, Article 200, Article 213, Article 355, etc.) over the executive and legislative entities of a state shall be used to implement the provisions of the Constitution.

In this respect, the governor has many different types of powers:
Executive powers related to administration, appointments and removals,
Legislative powers related to lawmaking and the state legislature, that is State Legislative Assembly (Vidhan Sabha) or State Legislative Council (Vidhan Parishad),
Discretionary powers to be carried out according to the discretion of the governor. The governors of India have similar powers and functions of the state level as those of the president of India at central level.

Executive powers 

The Constitution vests in the governor all the executive powers of the state government. The governor appoints the chief minister, who enjoys the support of the majority in the State Legislative Assembly. The governor also appoints the other members of the Council of Ministers and distributes portfolios to them on the advice of the chief minister.

The Council of Ministers remain in power during the 'pleasure' of the governor, but in the real sense it means the pleasure of obtaining majority in the Legislative Assembly. As long as the majority in the State Legislative Assembly supports the government, the Council of Ministers cannot be dismissed.

The governor appoints the chief minister of a state, the advocate general and the chairman and members of the State Public Service Commission. Apart from this, the state election commissioner is also appointed by the governor (though removed by the president). The president consults the governor in the appointment of judges of the High Courts and the governor appoints the judges of the district courts. All administrations are carried on the governor's name, and they also have the power to appoint staff for their tenure in class one and class four as per the constitution of India.

The governor of the state by virtue of their office is also the chancellor of most of the universities in the state. The dignity and impartiality of the office of the chancellor puts the governor in a unique position with regard to protecting the autonomy of the universities and saving them from undue political interference. The governor as chancellor of universities also acts as president of the Senate. The governor has the power to direct inspection of every component of the universities and affiliated colleges, required due action on the result of inquiry. The chancellor appoints search committee for appointments of vice chancellor. The governor accords consent of warrant of degrees and withdraws degree or distinctions both at the recommendations of the Senate. The governor approves or disapproves statutes passed by the Senate and appoints teachers of the university based on the recommendation of the respective committees.

Legislative powers 

The state head summons the sessions of both houses of the state legislature and prorogues them. The governor can even dissolve the state legislative assembly. These powers are formal and the governor's use of these powers must comply with the advice of the Council of Ministers headed by the chief minister.

The governor inaugurates (to dedicate) the state legislature by addressing it after the assembly elections and also at the beginning of the first session every year. The governor's address on these occasions generally outlines new policies of the state government.
A bill that the state legislature has passed, can become a law only after the governor gives assent. The governor can return a bill to the state legislature, if it is not a money bill, for reconsideration. However, if the state legislature sends it back to the governor for the second time, the governor must assent to it. This has rarely happened in the history of any of the states. Tamil Nadu, for example, resent its NEET Exemption Bill to its governor for the first and only time ever, in 2022, since the state's formation in 1950. The governor also has the power to reserve certain bills for the president.

When the state legislature is not in session and the governor considers it necessary to have a law, then the governor can promulgate ordinances. These ordinances are submitted to the state legislature at its next session. They remain valid for no more than six weeks from the date the state legislature is reconvened unless approved by it earlier. 

Governor is empowered under Article 192 to disqualify a member of a House of the State legislature when the election commission recommends that the legislator is no longer complying with provisions of Article 191.

Per Articles 165 and 177, the governor can ask the advocate general to attend the proceedings of both houses of the state legislature and report to them any unlawful functioning if any.

Financial powers 

The governor causes to be laid before the state legislature the annual financial statement which is the state budget. Further no demand for grant shall be made except on the governor's recommendation. They can also make advances out of the contingency fund of the state to meet any unforeseen expenditure. Moreover, the governor constitutes the Finance Commission of the state.

Discretionary powers 

The governor can use these powers are :
When no party gets a clear majority, the governor has discretion to choose a candidate for chief minister who will put together a majority coalition as soon as possible.
They can impose president's rule.
They submit reports on their own to the president or on the direction of the president regarding the affairs of the state.
They can withhold their assent to a bill and send it to the president for approval.
During emergency rule as per Article 353, the governor can override the advice of the council of ministers if specifically permitted by the president.

Contingency situation

The governor has no role or powers in a contingency situation such as president's rule unless specifically permitted by the president under articles 160, 356 and 357. The Governor is not permitted to take any decision on his own without state cabinet advise when an elected government is in charge under the provisions of Part VI of the constitution.

Emoluments

Various emoluments, allowances and privileges available to a governor are determined by the Governors (Emoluments, Allowances and Privileges) Act, 1982.

In addition to the monthly salary, the governor is entitled to rent free official residence, free household facilities and conveyance. The governor and his family are provided with free medical attendance, accommodation and treatment for life.

Removal 

The term of governor's office is normally five years but it can be terminated earlier by:
 Dismissal by the president at whose pleasure the governor holds office. Dismissal of governors without valid reason is not permitted. However, it is the duty of the president to dismiss a governor whose acts are upheld by courts as unconstitutional and malafide
 Resignation by the governor

There is no provision for impeachment, unlike with the president of India, judges of the high courts and the Supreme Court of India and the chief election commissioner.

Legal immunity

Under Article 361 of the constitution, governor can not be summoned for questioning except on his voluntary willingness to testify in the court in support of his controversial deeds though the unconstitutional decisions taken by the governor would be declared invalid by the courts. The case would be decided by the courts based on the facts furnished by the union government for the governor's role. As clarified by the Supreme Court in the case 'Rameshwar Prasad & Ors vs. Union of India & ANR 24 January 2006', though governor can not be prosecuted and imprisoned during his tenure, the governor can be prosecuted after stepping down from the post for the guilt committed during their term of governorship as declared earlier by the courts. No governor has resigned on impropriety to continue in office for declaring and nullifying his decisions as unconstitutional by the courts till now. No criminal case at least on the grounds of disrespecting constitution is lodged till now against former governors to punish them for their unconstitutional acts though many decisions taken during the term of governorship had been declared by Supreme Court as unconstitutional, mala fide, void, ultra vires, etc.

Analysis of role in Government
While the President of India is "elected", the governor is "selected" by the incumbent central government. That is why there have been many instances when governors appointed by a previous government are removed by an incoming government. The reasons are more political. The supreme court has ruled that governors should be given security of term but this is generally not adhered to.

Political observers have described governorship as "plush old age homes" wherein the governor does not stay impartial and act against popular state leaders. In 1984, Congressman Ram Lal dismissed the N. T. Rama Rao government and allowed N. Bhaskara Rao as chief minister of Andhra Pradesh for 31 days.

In January 2014, the Central Bureau of Investigation (CBI) approached the Union Law Ministry under the UPA Government to record statements of West Bengal governor M. K. Narayanan and Goa Governor Bharat Vir Wanchoo. Their statements were considered vital as Narayanan was National Security Adviser and Wanchoo was Chief of Special Protection Group (SPG) at the time of signing of contract with AgustaWestland. Their views were also considered before Indian Government signed the contract with Agusta Westland. However, Union Law ministry stonewalled CBI probe by rejecting CBI's request to examine them claiming they had 'immunity'. UPA was defeated in the 2014 general election and with the incoming NDA Government's permission, West Bengal governor M. K. Narayanan became the first ever governor to be questioned by police in a criminal case. The CBI questioned M. K. Narayanan as a "witness" in  3600-crore 2013 Indian helicopter bribery scandal. The CBI said Goa governor Bharat Vir Wanchoo would be questioned in the same case.

Arunachal Pradesh governor who is also appointed by the ruling party at the centre, has been sacked by the president after the Supreme Court has quashed his unconstitutional acts.

Lt Governor of Delhi Najeeb Jung resigned taking moral responsibility for his unconstitutional role when Supreme Court observed that the elected local government is not an unconstitutional institution without any powers.

See also 
 List of current Indian governors
 List of current Indian lieutenant governors and administrators
 List of female Indian governors and lieutenant governors
 Federalism in India
 Rajpramukh

References 

State governors of India